Örjans Vall is a football stadium in Halmstad, Sweden, built in 1922.

History 
The stadium was originally named Halmstads Idrottsplats (eng: Halmstad's Sports Ground), and was inaugurated by the Crown Prince of Sweden Gustaf Adolf, later king of Sweden, on 30 July 1922. 12,000 people had been allowed entrance to see the opening, several thousands more had gathered outside the fence and on Galgberget. In August 1922 the name of the arena changed to Örjans Vall after a medieval hospital by the name of S:t Örjans that had earlier been on the same location. On 3 September 1922 the first football game was played there.  Örjans Vall has been used for many different sports over the years, the football field was surrounded by running tracks, until the 1980s, and was the main site for the local athletic clubs. In the winter of 1956, due to very cold weather, the running tracks were covered with water freezing into a skating rink, Sigvard "Sigge" Ericsson, who had won one gold and one silver medal in the recent 1956 Winter Olympics, participated.
In 1972 the present day main-stand and scoreboard was completed, replacing the original wooden constructions from 1922.

The record for most spectators during a match is held by IS Halmia, in 1962 when Halmia played a qualification match against Landskrona BoIS, 20,381 spectators turned up to see the match.

In 2004 when Gyllene Tider celebrated 25 years, by starting and ending their national tour on Örjans Vall.

International tournaments 
Örjans Vall have been used for a number of different international tournaments held in Sweden.

FIFA World Cup

Sweden was selected to host the 1958 FIFA World Cup, among the cities chosen to host the World Cup was Halmstad. Örjans Vall came to host two games of Group 1.

UEFA Under-21 European Championship

The 2009 U21 European Championship, which was played in Sweden, was originally meant to be played at Gamla Ullevi in Gothenburg, Olympia in Helsingborg, Swedbank Stadion in Malmö, and Borås Arena in Borås, however Borås Arena have a Max Hamburgers restaurant on the arena area, which caused legal problem since the tournament is sponsored by McDonald's, for some time it appeared that the Max restaurant would be closed during the tournament, however Max refused later to close its restaurant and the competition was forced to move elsewhere and Örjans Vall in Halmstad was chosen as replacement for Borås.

Örjans Vall was used for 3 games in the tournament in group B.

UEFA Women's Euro

Örjans Vall was selected as one of seven stadiums to host the UEFA Women's Euro 2013 held in Sweden. The stadium was host to three group stage matches in the Group A and one of the quarter-finals.

Group A

Quarter-final

Demand for a new stadium 

In recent years HBK supporters have started to demand a new stadium, as the club have reached international competitions, but are not allowed to play on Örjans Vall due to security restrictions, they have instead been forced to play at Ullevi in Göteborg or Olympia in Helsingborg.

Temporary 2008 chairman Birgitta Johansson stated that a new stadium should be ready at the earliest in 2011–2012.

In September 2008 a decision to build a new stadium was reached by the local authorities, the new stadium would be placed at Sannarp's recreation ground and Örjans Vall will be demolished and replaced by apartments, the new arena is planned to be complete 2012, however on 5 May 2009 it was announced that there would not be a new arena as the Alliance city council announced its budget proposition.

References

External links 
 Halmstads BK article 
 Articles and events regarding a new stadium 

Football venues in Sweden
Sport in Halmstad
1958 FIFA World Cup stadiums
Buildings and structures completed in 1922
Buildings and structures in Halland County
UEFA Women's Euro 2013 venues